Murder in Arkansas constitutes the intentional killing, under circumstances defined by law, of people within or under the jurisdiction of the U.S. state of Arkansas.

The United States Centers for Disease Control and Prevention reported that in the year 2020, the state had one of the highest murder rates in the country.

Felony murder rule

In the state of Arkansas, the felony murder rule is defined as a  death that is caused "in the course of", "in the furtherance of" or "in the immediate flight" of a felony.  These deaths all must exhibit "extreme indifference to the value of human life" to qualify. The following predicate felonies are crimes when causing death automatically qualify the perpetrator for capital punishment in Arkansas:

 Terrorism
 Rape
 Kidnapping
 Vehicular piracy
 Robbery or aggravated robbery
 Residential or aggravated residential burglary
 Commercial burglary
 Felonies involving delivery of a controlled substance
 Escape of the first degree
 Arson

This is found in Arkansas Code, under capital punishment.

The remaining felonies that result in death of another are classified as first degree murder.  This is known as a "Class Y Felony" which carries a minimum prison term of ten years to a maximum of life. If the defendant was under 18 at the time of offense, a judge sets out a life sentence and they are eligible for parole after 30 years. For the remaining felonies, juveniles are eligible for parole after 25 years.

Penalties

References

External links
Arkansas Code - Free Public Access

Murder in Arkansas
U.S. state criminal law
Arkansas law